Kim Yeo-oul (also Kim Yeo-ul, ; born June 24, 1987) is a South Korean sport shooter. Kim represented South Korea at the 2008 Summer Olympics in Beijing, where she competed in the women's 10 m air rifle, along with her teammate Kim Chan-mi. She finished only in thirteenth place by one point ahead of Norway's Kristina Vestveit from the second attempt, for a total score of 395 targets.

References

External links
 
 NBC 2008 Olympics profile 

South Korean female sport shooters
Living people
Olympic shooters of South Korea
Shooters at the 2008 Summer Olympics
1987 births
Sportspeople from Incheon
20th-century South Korean women
21st-century South Korean women